Aleksandr Gennadiyevich Pogorelov (born 10 January 1980 in Zheleznogorsk, Kursk Oblast) is a Russian decathlete.

Career
In 2016, he was disqualified from the Beijing 2008 Olympics following reanalysis of his samples from the 2008 Olympics, resulted in a positive test for the prohibited substance turinabol. His results from 23 August 2008 till 29 February 2010 were annulled.

Achievements

References

External links
 

1980 births
Living people
Russian decathletes
Athletes (track and field) at the 2004 Summer Olympics
Athletes (track and field) at the 2008 Summer Olympics
Olympic athletes of Russia
World Athletics Championships medalists
Doping cases in athletics
Russian sportspeople in doping cases
Sportspeople from Kursk Oblast